Jordi Arrese was the defending champion and successfully defended his title, beating Alberto Berasategui in the final, 6–4, 3–6, 6–3.

Seeds

Draw

Finals

Top half

Bottom half

External links
 Main draw

ATP Athens Open
1993 ATP Tour